Vadim Ivanovich Yusov (20 April 1929 – 23 August 2013) was a Soviet and Russian cinematographer and professor at the Gerasimov Institute of Cinematography. He was known for his collaborations with Andrei Tarkovsky on The Steamroller and the Violin, Ivan's Childhood, Andrei Rublev and Solaris, and with Georgiy Daneliya on Walking the Streets of Moscow, Don't Grieve, Hopelessly Lost and Passport. He won a number of Nika Awards and Golden Osella for Ivan Dykhovichny's The Black Monk at the Venice International Film Festival in 1988.

He was a member of the jury at the 1984 Cannes Film Festival and the 45th Berlin International Film Festival in 1995.

Filmography
Cinematographer
The Steamroller and the Violin (1960); directed by Andrei Tarkovsky
Ivan's Childhood (1962); directed by Andrei Tarkovsky
Walking the Streets of Moscow (1963); directed by Georgiy Daneliya
Andrei Rublev (1966); directed by Andrei Tarkovsky
Don't Grieve (1969); directed by Georgiy Daneliya
Solaris (1972); directed by Andrei Tarkovsky
Hopelessly Lost (1973); directed by Georgiy Daneliya
They Fought for Their Country (1975); directed by Sergei Bondarchuk
Yuliya Vrevskaya (1977); directed by Nikola Korabov
Red Bells (1982); directed by Sergei Bondarchuk
Red Bells II (1983); directed by Sergei Bondarchuk
Boris Godunov (1986); directed by Sergei Bondarchuk
The Black Monk (1988); directed by Ivan Dykhovichny
Passport (1990); directed by Georgiy Daneliya
Anna: 6 - 18 (1993); directed by Nikita Mikhalkov
Out of the Present (1995); directed by Andrei Ujică
The Kopeck (2002); directed by Ivan Dykhovichny
Orange Juice (2010); directed by Andrei Proshkin
Screenwriter

 A Very English Murder (1974); directed by Samson Samsonov (together with Edgar Smirnov)

References

External links
 
  Профессия моя мне не надоела

1929 births
2013 deaths
People from Leningrad Oblast
Academicians of the Russian Academy of Cinema Arts and Sciences "Nika"
Gerasimov Institute of Cinematography alumni
Academic staff of the Gerasimov Institute of Cinematography
People's Artists of the RSFSR
Lenin Prize winners
Recipients of the Nika Award
Recipients of the Order "For Merit to the Fatherland", 4th class
Recipients of the Order of Honour (Russia)
Recipients of the Order of the Red Banner of Labour
Recipients of the USSR State Prize
Recipients of the Vasilyev Brothers State Prize of the RSFSR
Russian cinematographers
Soviet cinematographers
Burials at Novodevichy Cemetery